Tricholoma farinaceum is a mushroom of the agaric genus Tricholoma.

See also
List of North American Tricholoma

References

External links
 

Fungi described in 1913
Fungi of North America
farinaceum